Montreal Diocesan Theological College (known as Montreal Dio) is a theological seminary of the Anglican Church of Canada. It offers the Master of Divinity, Diploma in Ministry, Bachelor of Theology, and Master of Sacred Theology (S.T.M.) to candidates for ordination and other students, from Anglican and non-Anglican traditions. It also offers a distance education program, the Reading and Tutorial Course in Theology, leading to the Licentiate in Theology.

Andrew Taylor designed the former Montreal Diocesan Theological College building at University Street near Milton Street, 1895–96, mostly funded by the philanthropist Andrew Frederick Gault.

The college is a founding member of the ecumenical Montreal School of Theology, is affiliated with the McGill University School of Religious Studies, and is accredited by the Association of Theological Schools.

A World War I memorial window (1935) by Charles William Kelsey depicting Saint Stephen the Martyr was dedicated to Albert Withey of the 24th Canadian Battalion.

External links
 Montreal Diocesan Theological College
 McGill School of Religious Studies

References
 
 Howard, Oswald Montreal Diocesan Theological College (Montreal) Call Number  363.H.34.0

Anglican seminaries and theological colleges
Seminaries and theological colleges in Canada
Alumni of Montreal Diocesan Theological College
McGill University buildings